Mahogany is a reddish-brown color. It is approximately the color of the wood mahogany. However,  the wood itself, like most woods, is not uniformly the same color and is not recognized as a color by most. 

The first recorded use of mahogany as a color name in English was in 1737.


Variations of mahogany

Mahogany red
Mahogany red is equivalent to the color called mahogany in Crayola crayons. "Mahogany" was made a Crayola color in 1949.

The first recorded use of mahogany red as a color name in English was in 1843.

Mahogany brown
Mahogany brown is one of RAL colors.

Mahogany in media

Video games 
 In Pokémon, there is a village called Mahogany Town.

See also
List of colors

References

Notes
Reference for mahogany tints and shades chart:

Shades of brown